Vernon Park is the oldest country park in Stockport, Greater Manchester, England. The Victorian park contains the Vernon Park Museum.

History
Vernon Park opened on 20 September 1858 as Pinch Belly Park or the People's Park. It was built by Stockport Corporation on land donated by George John Warren (Lord Vernon). Work was given to the many unemployed mill workers of the time and it became known as Pinch Belly Park due to their hunger.

The park has Grade II status in the English Heritage Register of Historic Parks and Gardens. After being awarded £2.1 million from the Heritage Lottery for restoration, the park reopened on 29 September 2000.

Park
The council laid it out as a public park. One portion rises from the bank of the River Goyt which flows over a weir making a waterfall. There are statues, ponds, rock work, a fountain and planting. The park was formally opened by the Mayor of Stockport, William Williamson, on 20 September 1858. 

The park has a bandstand, a maze, a pond, a playground and a bowling green. The gardens include water features, a fernery, a sunken garden and herbaceous borders. The landscape includes tree-lined paths, statues and a cannon. The open views allow sight of the nearby mills.

Vernon Park Museum
A museum was opened in 1860. Originally known as the Stockport Museum, the building was renamed the Vernon Museum. In 2013 the museum was closed and many of its 2,800 objects were moved to the Stockport Story Museum. The building is now run by Pure Innovations and includes a cafe run by people with disabilities.

Gallery

References

External links
 Stockport Museums on Facebook
 Stockport Metropolitan Borough Council: official Stockport Museums page

Country parks in Greater Manchester
Stockport
1858 establishments in England
Grade II Historic Parks in England
Parks and commons in the Metropolitan Borough of Stockport